Surprise  (or La Surprise) was a World War II French Navy . Arsenal de Lorient in Brittany launched her on 17 June 1939. and she was commissioned in March 1940.

On 8 November 1942 the Royal Navy destroyer  sank Surprise by gunfire off Oran, French Algeria, during Operation Torch, the Allied invasion of French North Africa.

Notes

Sources

External links

Chamois-class minesweepers
Ships built in France
1939 ships
World War II minesweepers of France
World War II shipwrecks in the Mediterranean Sea
Maritime incidents in November 1942